This is a list of episodes from the eighth season of Shark Tank.

Episodes

Venture investor Chris Sacca returned as a guest shark in several episodes this season.

References

External links 
 Official website
 

8
2016 American television seasons
2017 American television seasons